Nathalie Gosselin (born March 31, 1966 in Lévis, Quebec) is a retired judoka from Canada, who won the bronze medal in the women's lightweight (– 56 kg) competition at the 1987 Pan American Games. She represented her native country at the 1996 Summer Olympics in Atlanta, Georgia, after having won the bronze medal in the women's half-lightweight division (– 52 kg) a year earlier at the 1995 Pan American Games. In 1986, she won the bronze medal in the 56 kg weight category at the judo demonstration sport event as part of the 1986 Commonwealth Games.

See also
Judo in Ontario
Judo in Canada
List of Canadian judoka

References

 Profile

1966 births
Canadian female judoka
Judoka at the 1995 Pan American Games
Judoka at the 1996 Summer Olympics
Living people
Olympic judoka of Canada
People from Lévis, Quebec
Sportspeople from Quebec
Pan American Games bronze medalists for Canada
Pan American Games medalists in judo
Medalists at the 1995 Pan American Games
20th-century Canadian women
21st-century Canadian women